Sebastián Maximiliano Rossi (born 12 February 1992 in Buenos Aires, Argentina) is an Argentine slalom canoeist who has competed since 2007.

At the 2012 Summer Olympics he competed in the C1 event but did not advance to the semifinals after finishing 16th in the qualifying round. He finished 17th in the C1 event at the 2016 Summer Olympics in Rio de Janeiro.

Sebastián won the bronze medal in the C2 event at the 2015 Pan American Games.

His younger brother Lucas is also a slalom canoeist.

References

External links
 
 
 
 
 

1992 births
Living people
Argentine male canoeists
Olympic canoeists of Argentina
Canoeists at the 2012 Summer Olympics
Canoeists at the 2016 Summer Olympics
Pan American Games medalists in canoeing
Pan American Games bronze medalists for Argentina
Canoeists at the 2015 Pan American Games
Medalists at the 2015 Pan American Games
Sportspeople from Buenos Aires